MIRAS or Miras may refer to:

 Miras, village and administrative unit of the Devoll municipality, Korçë County, southeastern Albania
 Miras (TV channel), a state-owned channel in Turkmenistan
 Mortgage Interest Relief At Source, tax relief for mortgages in the UK
 Microwave Imaging Radiometer with Aperture Synthesis
 Multi-Color Infrared Alerting Sensor, missile warning sensor for the Airbus A400M
 Multiple isomorphous replacement with Anomalous Signal, method to solve crystallographic structures of proteins
 Mir Infrared Spectrometer, science instrument on the Mir space station 

 Domingo Miras
 Fernando López Miras
 Shah Miras
 Aravind Miras